The Baures River is a river in Bolivia.

References

Rivers of Beni Department